The African Men's Volleyball Championship is the official competition for senior men's national volleyball teams of Africa, organized by the African Volleyball Confederation (CAVB). The initial gap between championships was variable, but since 1987 they have been awarded every two years. The current champion is Tunisia, which won its eleventh title at the 2021 tournament in Kigali.

Summary

Medal summary

Participating nations

See also

 Women's African Volleyball Championship
 Volleyball at the African Games
 Men's U23 African Volleyball Championship
 African Volleyball Championship U21
 African Volleyball Championship U19

References

External links
 African Volleyball Championship (todor66.com)

 

African championship
African championship
Recurring sporting events established in 1967
African championships
Biennial sporting events
Volleyball competitions in Africa